Luftlande-Sturm-Regiment 1 (also known as Sturmabteilung Koch) was a German Fallschirmjäger regiment in the Luftwaffe which captured the Belgian Fort Eben-Emael during the Battle of Belgium, took part in the Battle of Crete, and fought on the Eastern Front during World War II.

Operational history

The Battalion was formed in November 1939; it was named after its commander, Captain Walter Koch, as Assault Battalion Koch. It was intended to open the way into central Belgium by capturing the formidable Fort Eben-Emael defending the Albert Canal as well three bridges over the canal. The DFS 230 gliders were to be used to allow the assault groups to silently land virtually on top of their objectives, surprising the defenders and preventing them from destroying the bridge. The airborne assault took place on 10 May 1940. The Belgian defenders were unable to muster any serious counterattacks against the paratroops.

Two more battalions were formed during the fall of 1940 and the unit was redesignated as the 1st Air Landing Assault Regiment. A fourth battalion was raised during the winter of 1940/41. The regiment did not participate in the opening stages of the invasions of Greece and Yugoslavia, but was kept in reserve until it was needed for the invasion of Crete. The 1st battalion was landed by DFS 230 gliders towed by Ju 52s of Luftlandegeschwader 1, but the rest of the regiment was parachuted in the vicinity of Maleme airfield on 20 May 1941. They landed almost on top of the New Zealand 5th Infantry Brigade, part of the 2nd New Zealand Infantry Division and suffered severely at their hands. However, reinforced by several battalions of the 5th Gebirgs (Mountain) Division that landed the next day they were able to force the New Zealanders to retreat. This was the only time in the war that the regiment fought as a complete unit. Following the surrender of Crete, regiment forces were involved in murdering civilians in villages such as Kondomari, Alikianos and Kandanos.

After reforming and refitting, the regiment took part in the fighting in the Soviet Union prior to and during the Soviet winter counter-offensive. The 2nd Battalion was deployed in the Army Group North sector. The 4th Battalion arrived to the Soviet Union in  November to shore up German defenses near Stalino. The 1st Battalion was flown to Smolensk on 6 December 1941 and then moved to the Yukhnov area, west of Kaluga, to bolster the German defenses there. It was transferred to France in May 1942. The regimental staff accompanied the 1st Battalion to the Soviet Union, but was used to control many of the Luftwaffe units forced into a ground-combat role by the Soviet winter counter-offensive. It was redesignated as Stab Luftwaffe-Division Meindl in February 1942. Elements of the regiment also took part in the fighting in the Rzhev area starting on 3 January 1942, to reinforce defenses of the 9th Army. This unit was transferred to France on 10 April 1942

Commanders
Walter Koch, 2 November 1939 – 31 August 1940
Eugen Meindl, 1 September 1940 – 21 May 1941
Hermann-Bernhard Ramcke, 21 May-18 June 1941
Eugen Meindl, 19 June 1941 – 26 February 1942

References
Brehde, Dietrich. Der Blaue Komet: Geschichte des IV. Battalion des Luftlande-Sturmregiments 1940-1945. 2. Auflage. München: Schild, 1988 
Busch, Erich. Die Fallschirmjäger Chronik 1935 - 1945. Friedberg, Germany: Podzun-Pallas, 1983 
Gola, Karl-Heinz. Die deutsche Fallschirmtruppe 1936-41: Ihr Aufbau und ihr Einsatz in den ersten Feldzügen der Wehrmacht. Hamburg: E. S. Mittler & Sohn, 2006 
Nasse, Jean-Yves. Green Devils!: German Paratroopers 1939 - 1945. Paris: Histoire & Collections, 1997 
Pöppel, Martin. Heaven & Hell: The War Diary of a German Paratrooper. Staplehurst, Kent, England: Spellmount, 1988 
Quarrie, Bruce. German Airborne Divisions: Blitzkrieg 1940-41. Oxford, England: Osprey Publishing, 2004 
Schmitz, Peter, et al. Die deutschen Divisionen 1939-1945: Band 2, Die Divisionen 6-10. Osnabrück, Germany: Biblio, 1994 
Stimpel, Hans-Martin. Die deutsche Fallschirmtruppe 1942-45: Einsätz auf Kriegsschauplätzen im Osten und Westen. Hamburg: E. S. Mittler & Sohn, 2001

External links
 Battle for Crete - Order of Battle : 4th Air Fleet, Airborne Assault Regiment

Airborne units and formations of Germany
Regiments of the Luftwaffe
Military units and formations established in 1939
Military units and formations disestablished in 1942